Ranhat is a village of 8 No. Harian Union of Paba Upazila, Rajshahi, Bangladesh.

Geography 

Demographics 
According to the 2011 Bangladesh census, Ranhat had 501 households and a population of 1,845, of which males constituted 49.1% and females 50.9%. 8.4% of the population was under the age of 5. The literacy rate (age 7 and over) was 45.4%, compared to the national average of 51.8%. Islam is the major religion; 97.1% of people are Muslim, the rest are Hindu.

Education

M. R. K. College and M. R. K. High School, both in the neighboring village of Kukhandi, are the nearest college and secondary school.

References 

Rajshahi Division
Villages in Rajshahi District
Villages in Rajshahi Division